José López Medina (born 29 October 1939) is a Mexican politician affiliated with the Institutional Revolutionary Party. As of 2014, he served as Deputy of the LIX Legislature of the Mexican Congress representing Puebla as replacement of Rafael Moreno Valle Rosas.

References

1939 births
Living people
People from Puebla
Members of the Chamber of Deputies (Mexico)
Institutional Revolutionary Party politicians